Mountain marathon is an extended form of fell running, usually over two days and often with a strong orienteering element. Competitors usually participate in teams of two, and have to carry their own food and tent. There are various classes of event (such as, for the Original Mountain Marathon - Elite, A, B, C, D and Long, Medium and Short Score).

The major events are listed below:
Marmot Dark Mountain s - held on the last weekend of January each year.
The Lowe Alpine Mountain Marathon (LAMM) - held in the Scottish Highlands in June (ended in 2018).
The Scottish Mountain Marathon (SMM) - a new event in Scotland in June.
The Saunders Lakeland Mountain Marathon (SLMM) - held in or near the Lake District in early July.
The Mourne Mountain Marathon held in Mourne Mountains, County Down, Northern Ireland in September.
The ROC Mountain Marathon - held on the last weekend of September each year
The Original Mountain Marathon (OMM - Formerly the Karrimor International Mountain Marathon/KIMM) - held in a UK hill or mountain area in the last weekend in October.
The Swiss International Mountain Marathon (since 1976: Formerly Karrimor International Mountain Marathon / KIMM Switzerland / Mammut International Mountain Marathon / MIMM Switzerland / R'adys Mountain Marathon) - held in Switzerland in mid August. In autumn 2013 the event has changed its name again ...

The Highlander Mountain Marathon which began in 2007 and was held in April at a Scottish location 'within a 2 hour drive of Inverness' has now come to an end.

New competitors can receive training from various organization for example Trail Running Scotland.

The start arrangements on the two days are usually different (and are designed to encourage navigational independence).
For example, on day 1 of the SLMM a staggered start is used, with teams being sent off at 1 or 2 minute intervals, and not getting their way-cards until they are 'on the clock'.
On Day 2 the overnight leaders are often sent off half an hour before the others (a 'chasing start') and a mass start, for those more than half an hour behind overnight, then follows.

The races have provided the stimulus for various items of specialist lightweight equipment, for instance lightweight tents and multipouched running rucksacks (the 'OMM Classic Marathon 25 or 32 Sac').

References

External links
PlanetFear website, review of equipment
Competitor's website
https://www.facebook.com/groups/orienteeringmountainmarathon/

Orienteering
Mountain running